Keanu Charles Reeves (born September 2, 1964) is a Canadian actor. Born in Beirut and raised in Toronto, Reeves began acting in theatre productions and in television films before making his feature film debut in Youngblood (1986). He had his breakthrough role in the science fiction comedy Bill & Ted's Excellent Adventure (1989), and he reprised his role in its sequels. He gained praise for playing a hustler in the independent drama My Own Private Idaho (1991) and established himself as an action hero with leading roles in Point Break (1991) and Speed (1994).

Following several box office failures, Reeves's performance in the horror film The Devil's Advocate (1997) was well received. Greater stardom came for playing Neo in the science fiction series The Matrix, beginning in 1999. He played John Constantine in Constantine (2005) and starred in the romantic drama The Lake House (2006), the science fiction thriller The Day the Earth Stood Still (2008), and the crime thriller Street Kings (2008). Following another commercially down period, Reeves made a successful comeback by playing the titular assassin in the John Wick film series, beginning in 2014.

In addition to acting, Reeves has directed the film Man of Tai Chi (2013). He has played bass guitar for the band Dogstar and pursued other endeavours such as writing and philanthropy.

Early life
Keanu Charles Reeves was born in Beirut, Lebanon, on September 2, 1964, the son of Patricia (née Taylor), a costume designer and performer, and Samuel Nowlin Reeves Jr. His mother is English, originating from Essex. His American father is from Hawaii, and is of Native Hawaiian, Chinese, English, Irish, and Portuguese descent. His grandmother from his father's side is Chinese Hawaiian. His mother was working in Beirut when she met his father, who abandoned his wife and family when Reeves was three years old. Reeves last met his father on the Hawaiian island of Kauai when he was 13.

After his parents divorced in 1966, his mother moved the family to Sydney, and then to New York City, where she married Paul Aaron, a Broadway and Hollywood director, in 1970. The couple moved to Toronto, Canada, and divorced in 1971. When Reeves was nine, he took part in a theatre production of Damn Yankees. Aaron remained close to Reeves, offering him advice and recommending him a job at the Hedgerow Theater in Pennsylvania, United States. Reeves's mother married Robert Miller, a rock music promoter, in 1976; the couple divorced in 1980. She subsequently married her fourth husband, a hairdresser named Jack Bond; the marriage lasted until 1994. Reeves and his sisters grew up primarily in the Yorkville neighbourhood of Toronto, with a nanny caring for them frequently. Because of his grandmother's ethnicity, he grew up with Chinese art, furniture, and cuisine. Reeves watched British comedy shows such as The Two Ronnies, and his mother imparted English manners that he has maintained into adulthood.

Describing himself as a "private kid", Reeves attended four different high schools, including the Etobicoke School of the Arts, from which he was expelled. Reeves said he was expelled because he was "just a little too rambunctious and shot my mouth off once too often... I was not generally the most well-oiled machine in the school".
Reeves has dyslexia and has said, "Because I had trouble reading, I wasn’t a good student".
At De La Salle College, he was a successful ice hockey goalkeeper. Reeves had aspirations to become a professional ice hockey player for the Canadian Olympic team but decided to become an actor when he was 15.
After leaving De La Salle College, he attended Avondale Secondary Alternative School, which allowed him to get an education while working as an actor. He dropped out of high school when he was 17.
He obtained a green card through his American stepfather and moved to Los Angeles, United States three years later. Reeves holds only Canadian citizenship.

Career

1984–1990: Early work
In 1984, Reeves was a correspondent for the Canadian Broadcasting Corporation (CBC) youth television program Going Great. That same year, he made his acting debut in an episode of the television series, called Hangin' In. In 1985, he played Mercutio in a stage production of Romeo and Juliet at the Leah Posluns Theatre in North York, Ontario. He made further appearances on stage, including Brad Fraser's cult hit Wolfboy in Toronto. He also appeared in a Coca-Cola commercial in 1983, and in the National Film Board of Canada (NFB) coming-of-age, short film One Step Away.

Reeves made a foray into television films in 1986, including NBC's Babes in Toyland, Act of Vengeance and Brotherhood of Justice. He made his first motion picture appearances in Peter Markle's Youngblood (1986), in which he played a goalkeeper, and in the low-budget romantic drama, Flying. He was cast as Matt in River's Edge, a crime drama about a group of high school friends dealing with a murder case, loosely based on the 1981 murder of Marcy Renee Conrad. The film premiered in 1986 at the Toronto International Film Festival to a largely positive response. Janet Maslin of The New York Times describes the performances of the young cast as "natural and credible", with Reeves being described as "affecting and sympathetic".

Towards the end of the 1980s, Reeves starred in several dramas aimed at teen audiences, including as the lead in The Night Before (1988), a comedy starring opposite Lori Loughlin, The Prince of Pennsylvania (1988) and Permanent Record (1988). Although the latter received mixed reviews, Variety magazine praised Reeves's performance, "which opens up nicely as the drama progresses". His other acting efforts included a supporting role in Dangerous Liaisons (1988), which earned seven nominations at the 61st Academy Awards, winning three: Best Adapted Screenplay, Best Costume Design, and Best Production Design. This was followed by Bill & Ted's Excellent Adventure (1989), in which he portrays a slacker who travels through time with a friend (portrayed by Alex Winter), to assemble historical figures for a school presentation. The film was generally well received by critics and grossed $40.5 million at the worldwide box office. Film review aggregator Rotten Tomatoes gave the film a 79% approval rating with the critical consensus: "Keanu Reeves and Alex Winter are just charming, goofy, and silly enough to make this fluffy time-travel Adventure work".

In 1989, Reeves starred in the comedy-drama Parenthood directed by Ron Howard. Nick Hilditch of the BBC gave the film three out of five stars, calling it a "feelgood movie" with an "extensive and entertaining ensemble cast". In 1990, Reeves had two acting performances in films. He portrayed an incompetent hitman in the black comedy I Love You to Death, and played the role of Martin, a radio station employee in the comedy Tune in Tomorrow. He also appeared in Paula Abdul's music video for Rush Rush which featured a Rebel Without a Cause motif, with him in the James Dean role.

1991–1994: Breakthrough with adult roles

In 1991, Reeves starred in Bill & Ted's Bogus Journey, a sequel to Bill & Ted's Excellent Adventure, with his co-star Alex Winter. Michael Wilmington of the Los Angeles Times wrote that the sequel was "more imaginative, more opulent, wilder and freer, more excitingly visualized", praising the actors for their "fuller" performances. Film critic Roger Ebert thought it was "a riot of visual invention and weird humour that works on its chosen sub-moronic level [...] It's the kind of movie where you start out snickering in spite of yourself, and end up actually admiring the originality that went into creating this hallucinatory slapstick". The rest of 1991 marked a significant transition for Reeves's career as he undertook adult roles. He co-starred with River Phoenix as a street hustler in the adventure My Own Private Idaho, the characters embark on a journey of personal discovery. The story was written by Gus Van Sant and is loosely based on Shakespeare's Henry IV, Part 1, Henry IV, Part 2, and Henry V. The film premiered at the 48th Venice International Film Festival, followed by a theatrical release in the United States on September 29, 1991. The film earned $6.4 million at the box office. My Own Private Idaho was positively received, with Owen Gleiberman of Entertainment Weekly describing the film as "a postmodern road movie with a mood of free-floating, trance-like despair[...] a rich, audacious experience". The New York Times complimented Reeves and Phoenix saying they had insightful performances.

Reeves starred alongside Patrick Swayze, Lori Petty and Gary Busey in the action thriller Point Break (1991), directed by Kathryn Bigelow. He plays an undercover FBI agent tasked with investigating the identities of a group of bank robbers. To prepare for the film, Reeves and his co-stars took surfing lessons with professional surfer Dennis Jarvis in Hawaii; Reeves had never surfed before. After its release Point Break was generally well-received, and a commercial success, earning $83.5 million at the box office. Reeves's performance was praised by The New York Times for "considerable discipline and range", adding, "He moves easily between the buttoned-down demeanour that suits a police procedural story and the loose-jointed manner of his comic roles". Writing for The Washington Post, Hal Hinson called Reeves the "perfect choice" and praised the surfing scenes, but said that "the filmmakers have their characters make the most ludicrously illogical choices imaginable". At the 1992 MTV Movie Awards, Reeves won the Most Desirable Male award.

In 1991, Reeves developed an interest in a music career; he formed an alternative rock band called Dogstar, consisting of members Robert Mailhouse, Gregg Miller and Bret Domrose. Reeves played the bass guitar. A year later, he played Jonathan Harker in Francis Ford Coppola's Gothic horror Bram Stoker's Dracula, based on Stoker's 1897 novel Dracula. Starring alongside Gary Oldman, Winona Ryder and Anthony Hopkins, the film was critically and commercially successful. It grossed $215.8 million worldwide. For his role Reeves was required to speak with an English accent, which drew some ridicule; "Overly posh and entirely ridiculous, Reeves's performance is as painful as it is hilarious", wrote Limara Salt of Virgin Media. In a retrospective interview in 2015, director Coppola said, "[Reeves] tried so hard [...] He wanted to do it perfectly and in trying to do it perfectly it came off as stilted". Bram Stoker's Dracula was nominated for four Academy Awards, winning three in Best Costume Design, Best Sound Editing and Best Makeup. The film also received four nominations at the British Academy Film Awards.

In 1993, he had a role in Much Ado About Nothing which was based on Shakespeare's play of the same name. The film received positive reviews, although Reeves was nominated for a Golden Raspberry Award for Worst Supporting Actor. The New Republic magazine thought his casting was "unfortunate" because of his amateur performance. In that same year, he starred in two more drama films, Even Cowgirls Get the Blues and Little Buddha, both of which garnered a mixed-to-negative reception. The Independent critic gave Little Buddha a mixed review but opined that Reeves's part as a prince was "credible". The film also left an impression on Reeves; he later said, "When I played this innocent prince who starts to suspect something when he has the first revelations about old age, sickness and death, it hit me. [...] That lesson has never left me."

He starred in the action thriller Speed (1994) alongside Sandra Bullock and Dennis Hopper. He plays police officer Jack Traven. To prevent a bus from exploding Traven has to keep its speed above 50 mph. Speed was the directorial debut of Dutch director Jan de Bont. Several actors were considered for the lead role, but Reeves was chosen because Bont was impressed with his Point Break performance. For the movie, Reeves shaved all his hair off and spent two months in the gym to gain muscle mass. During production, Reeves's friend River Phoenix (and co-star in My Own Private Idaho) died, resulting in adjustments to the filming schedule to allow him to mourn. Speed was released on June 10 to a critically acclaimed response. Gene Siskel of the Chicago Tribune lauded Reeves, calling him "absolutely charismatic [...] giving a performance juiced with joy as he jumps through elevator shafts [...] and atop a subway train". David Ansen, writing for Newsweek, summarized Speed as, "Relentless without being overbearing, this is one likely blockbuster that doesn't feel too big for its britches. It's a friendly juggernaut". The film grossed $350 million from a $30 million budget and won two Academy Awards in 1995Best Sound Editing and Best Sound.

1995–1998: Continued acting efforts

Reeves'snext leading role came in the 1995 cyberpunk action thriller Johnny Mnemonic, directed by artist Robert Longo and based on the 1981 story of the same name by William Gibson. Set in 2021, it is about a man who has a cybernetic brain implant and must deliver a data package before he dies or is killed by the Yakuza. The film received mainly negative reviews and critics felt Reeves was "woefully miscast". Roger Ebert opined that the film is one of the "great goofy gestures of recent cinema, a movie that doesn't deserve one nanosecond of serious analysis but has a kind of idiotic grandeur that makes you almost forgive it." As part of the film studio's marketing efforts, a CD-ROM video game was also released.

He next appeared in the romantic drama A Walk in the Clouds (1995), which also garnered mixed-to-negative reviews. Reeves plays a young soldier returning home from World War II, trying to settle down with a woman he married impulsively just before he enlisted. Film critic Mick LaSalle opined that "A Walk in the Clouds is for the most part a beautiful, well-acted and emotionally rich picture", whereas Hal Hinson from The Washington Post said, "The film has the syrupy, Kodak magic-moment look of a Bo Derek movie, and pretty much the same level of substance".

Besides film work, Reeves retreated briefly to the theatre playing Prince Hamlet in a 1995 Manitoba Theatre Centre production of Hamlet in Winnipeg, Manitoba. The Sunday Times critic Roger Lewis believed his performance, writing he "quite embodied the innocence, the splendid fury, the animal grace of the leaps and bounds, the emotional violence, that form the Prince of Denmark... He is one of the top three Hamlets I have seen, for a simple reason: he is Hamlet".

Reeves was soon drawn to science fiction roles, appearing in Chain Reaction (1996) with co-stars Morgan Freeman, Rachel Weisz, Fred Ward, Kevin Dunn and Brian Cox. He plays a researcher of a green energy project, who is framed for murder and has to go on the lam. Chain Reaction was not a critical success and gained mostly a negative reaction; review aggregator Rotten Tomatoes gave it a rating of 16% and described it as "a man-on-the-run thriller that mostly sticks to generic formula". Reeves's film choices after Chain Reaction were also critical disappointments. He starred in the independent crime comedy Feeling Minnesota (1996), with Vincent D'Onofrio and Cameron Diaz, which was described as "shoddily assembled, and fundamentally miscast" by Rotten Tomatoes. In that year, he turned down an offer to star in Speed 2: Cruise Control, despite being offered a salary of $12 million. According to Reeves, this decision caused 20th Century Fox to sever ties with him for a decade.

Instead Reeves toured with his band Dogstar, and appeared in the drama The Last Time I Committed Suicide (1997), based on a 1950 letter written by Neal Cassady to Jack Kerouac. Reeves's performance received mixed reviews; Paul Tatara of CNN called him "void of talent [...] here he is again, reciting his lines as if they're non-related words strung together as a memory exercise", whereas Empire magazine thought "Reeves gives the nearest thing to a performance in his career as the enthusiastic feckless drunk". He starred in the 1997 supernatural horror The Devil's Advocate alongside Al Pacino and Charlize Theron; Reeves agreed to a pay cut of several million dollars meaning the film studio could afford to hire Pacino. Based on Andrew Neiderman's novel of the same name, the feature is about a successful young lawyer invited to New York City to work for a major firm, who discovers the owner of the firm is a devil. The Devil's Advocate attracted positive reviews from critics. Film critic James Berardinelli called the film "highly enjoyable" and wrote, "There are times when Reeves lacks the subtlety that would have made this a more multi-layered portrayal, but it's nevertheless a solid job".

1999–2004: Stardom with The Matrix franchise and comedies

In 1999, Reeves starred in the critically acclaimed science fiction film The Matrix, the first installment in what would become The Matrix franchise. Reeves portrays computer programmer Thomas Anderson, a hacker using the alias "Neo", who discovers humanity is trapped inside a simulated reality created by intelligent machines. Written and directed by the Wachowskis, Reeves had to prepare by reading Kevin Kelly's Out of Control: The New Biology of Machines, Social Systems, and the Economic World, and Dylan Evans's ideas on evolutionary psychology. The principal cast underwent months of intense training with martial arts choreographer Yuen Woo-ping to prepare for the fight scenes. The Matrix proved to be a box office success; several critics considered it to be one of the best science fiction films of all time. Kenneth Turan of the Los Angeles Times felt it was a "wildly cinematic futuristic thriller that is determined to overpower the imagination", despite perceiving weaknesses in the film's dialogue. Janet Maslin of The New York Times credited Reeves for being a "strikingly chic Prada model of an action hero", and thought the martial arts stunts were the film's strongest feature. The Matrix received Academy Awards for Best Film Editing, Best Sound Editing, Best Visual Effects, and Best Sound.

After the success of The Matrix, Reeves avoided another blockbuster in favour of a lighthearted sports comedy, The Replacements (2000). He agreed to a pay cut to enable Gene Hackman to co-star in the film. Against his wishes, Reeves starred in the thriller The Watcher (2000), playing a serial killer who stalks a retired FBI agent. He said that a friend forged his signature on a contract, which he could not prove; he appeared in the film to avoid legal action. Upon its release, the film was critically panned. That year, he had a supporting role in another thriller, Sam Raimi's The Gift, a story about a woman (played by Cate Blanchett) with extrasensory perception asked to help find a young woman who disappeared. The film grossed $44 million worldwide. Film critic Paul Clinton of CNN thought the film was fairly compelling, saying of Reeves's acting: "[Raimi] managed to get a performance out of Reeves that only occasionally sounds like he's reading his lines from the back of a cereal box."

In 2001, Reeves continued to explore and accept roles in a diverse range of genres. The first was a romantic drama, Sweet November, a remake of the 1968 film of the same name. This was his second collaboration with Charlize Theron; the film was met with a generally negative reception. Desson Thompson of The Washington Post criticized it for its "syrupy cliches, greeting-card wisdom and over-the-top tragicomedy", but commended Reeves for his likability factor in every performance he gives. Hardball (2001) marked Reeves's attempt in another sports comedy. Directed by Brian Robbins, it is based on the book Hardball: A Season in the Projects by Daniel Coyle. Reeves plays Conor O'Neill, a troubled young man who agrees to coach a Little League team from the Cabrini Green housing project in Chicago as a condition of obtaining a loan. Film critic Roger Ebert noted the film's desire to tackle difficult subjects and baseball coaching, but felt it lacked depth, and Reeves's performance was "glum and distant".

By 2002, his professional music career came to an end with Dogstar disbanding. The band had released two albums during their decade together; Our Little Visionary in 1996 and Happy Ending in 2000. Sometime afterwards, Reeves performed in the band Becky for a year, founded by Dogstar band-mate Rob Mailhouse, but quit in 2005, citing a lack of interest in a serious music career. After being absent from the screen in 2002, Reeves returned to The Matrix sequels in 2003 with The Matrix Reloaded and The Matrix Revolutions, released in May and November, respectively. Principal photography for both films was completed back-to-back, primarily at Fox Studios in Australia. The Matrix Reloaded garnered mostly favourable reviews; John Powers of LA Weekly praised the "dazzling pyrotechnics" but was critical of certain machine-like action scenes. Critiquing Reeves's acting, Powers thought it was somewhat "wooden" but felt he has the ability to "exude a charmed aura". Andrew Walker, writing for the Evening Standard, praised the cinematography ("visually it gives full value as a virtuoso workout for your senses") but he was less taken by the film's "dime-store philosophy". The film grossed $739 million worldwide.

The Matrix Revolutions, the third instalment, was met with mixed reception. According to review aggregator Rotten Tomatoes, the consensus was that "characters and ideas take a back seat to the special effects". Paul Clinton, writing for CNN, praised the special effects but felt Reeves's character was unfocused. In contrast the San Francisco Chronicles Carla Meyer was highly critical of the special effects, writing, "[The Wachowskis] computer-generated imagery goes from dazzling to deadening in action scenes that favor heavy, clanking weaponry over the martial-arts moves that thrilled viewers of The Matrix and The Matrix Reloaded." Nevertheless the film grossed a healthy $427 million worldwide, although less than the two previous films. Something's Gotta Give, a romantic comedy, was Reeves's last release of 2003. He co-starred with Jack Nicholson and Diane Keaton; he played Dr. Julian Mercer in the film. Something's Gotta Give received generally favourable reviews.

2005–2013: Thrillers, documentaries and directorial debut

In 2005, Reeves played the titular role in Constantine, an occult detective film, about a man who has the ability to perceive and communicate with half-angels and half-demons. The film was a respectable box office hit, grossing $230 million worldwide from a $100 million budget but attracted mixed-to-positive reviews. The Sydney Morning Heralds critic wrote that "Constantine isn't bad, but it doesn't deserve any imposing adjectives. It's occasionally cheesy, sometimes enjoyable, intermittently scary, and constantly spiked with celestial blatherskite". He next appeared in Thumbsucker, which premiered at the Sundance Film Festival in 2005. A comedy adapted from the 1999 Walter Kirn novel of the same name, the story follows a boy with a thumb-sucking problem. Reeves and the cast garnered positive critical reviews, with The Washington Post describing it as "a gently stirring symphony about emotional transition filled with lovely musical passages and softly nuanced performances".

Reeves appeared in the Richard Linklater-directed animated science fiction thriller A Scanner Darkly, which premiered at the 2006 Cannes Film Festival. Reeves played Bob Arctor/Fred, an undercover agent in a futuristic dystopia under high-tech police surveillance. Based on the novel of the same name by Philip K. Dick, the film was a box office failure. However the film attracted generally favourable reviews; Paul Arendt of the BBC thought the film was "beautiful to watch", but Reeves was outshone by his co-star Robert Downey Jr. His next role was Alex Wyler in The Lake House (2006), a romantic drama adaptation of the South Korean film Il Mare (2000), which reunited him with Sandra Bullock. Despite its box office success, Mark Kermode of The Guardian was highly critical, writing "this syrup-drenched supernatural whimsy achieves stupidity at a genuinely international level [...] The last time Bullock and Reeves were together on screen the result was Speed. This should have been entitled Stop". Towards the end of 2006, he co-narrated The Great Warming with Alanis Morissette, a documentary about climate change mitigation.

Next in 2008, Reeves collaborated with director David Ayer on the crime thriller Street Kings. He played an undercover policeman attempting to clear his name after the death of another officer. Released on April 11, the film grossed a moderate $66 million worldwide. The film's plot and Reeves' performance, however, were met with mostly unenthusiastic reviews. Paul Byrnes of The Sydney Morning Herald stated, "It's full of twists and turns, a dead body in every reel, but it's not difficult to work out who's betraying whom, and that's just not good enough". The Guardian opined that "Reeves is fundamentally blank and uninteresting". Reeves starred in another science fiction film, The Day the Earth Stood Still, a loose adaptation of the 1951 film of the same name. He portrayed Klaatu, an alien sent from outer space to try to change human behavior or eradicate humans because of their environmental impact. At the 2009 Razzie Awards, the film was nominated for Worst Prequel, Remake, Rip-off or Sequel. Many critics were unimpressed with the heavy use of special effects; The Telegraph credited Reeves' ability to engage the audience, but thought the cinematography was abysmal and the "sub-Al-Gore environment lecture leaves you light-headed with tedium".

Rebecca Miller's The Private Lives of Pippa Lee was Reeves' sole release of 2009, which premiered at the 59th Berlin International Film Festival. The romantic comedy and its ensemble received an amicable review from The Telegraphs David Gritten; "Miller's film is a triumph. Uniformly well acted, it boasts a psychologically knowing script, clearly written by a smart, assertive human". In 2010, he starred in another romantic comedy, Henry's Crime, about a man who is released from prison for a crime he did not commit, but then targets the same bank with his former cellmate. The film was not a box office hit. Reeves' only work in 2011 was an adult picture book titled Ode to Happiness, which he wrote, complemented by Alexandra Grant's illustrations. Reeves co-produced and appeared in a 2012 documentary, Side by Side. He interviewed filmmakers including James Cameron, Martin Scorsese, and Christopher Nolan; the feature investigated the creation digital and photochemical film. Next Reeves starred in Generation Um... (2012), an independent drama which was critically panned.

In 2013, Reeves starred in his own directorial debut, the martial arts film Man of Tai Chi. The film has multilingual dialogue and follows a young man drawn to an underground fight club, partially inspired by the life of Reeves' friend Tiger Chen. Principal photography took place in China and in Hong Kong. Reeves was also assisted by Yuen Woo-ping, the fight choreographer of The Matrix films. Man of Tai Chi premiered at the Beijing Film Festival and the Cannes Film Festival, and received praise from director John Woo. A wider, warm response followed suit; Bilge Ebiri of Vulture thought the fight sequences were "beautifully assembled", and Reeves showed restraint with the film editing to present the fighters' motion sequences. The Los Angeles Times wrote, "The brutally efficient shooting style Reeves employs to film master choreographer Yuen Woo-ping's breathtaking fights [...] is refreshingly grounded and old-school kinetic", while Dave McGinn of The Globe and Mail called the film "ambitious but generic". At the box office, Man of Tai Chi was a commercial disappointment, grossing only $5.5 million worldwide from a budget of $25 million. Also in 2013, Reeves played Kai in the 3D fantasy 47 Ronin, a Japanese fable about a group of rogue samurai. The film premiered in Japan but failed to gain traction with audiences; reviews were not positive, causing Universal Pictures to reduce advertising for the film elsewhere. 47 Ronin was a box office flop and was mostly poorly received.

2014–present: Resurgence with John Wick

After this series of commercial failures, Reeves' career rebounded in 2014. He played the titular role in the action thriller John Wick, directed by Chad Stahelski. In the first instalment of the John Wick franchise, Reeves plays a retired hitman seeking vengeance. He worked closely with the screenwriter to develop the story; "We all agreed on the potential of the project. I love the role, but you want the whole story, the whole ensemble to come to life", Reeves said. Filmed on location in the New York City area, the film was eventually released on October 24 in the United States. The Hollywood Reporter was impressed by the director's "confident, muscular action debut", and Reeves' "effortless" performance, which marked his return to the action genre. Jeannette Catsoulis of The New York Times praised Reeves' fight scenes and wrote he is "always more comfortable in roles that demand cool over hot, attitude over emotion". John Wick proved to be a box office success, grossing $86 million worldwide. Next, Reeves starred in a smaller-scale horror feature, Knock Knock (2015), a remake of the 1977 film Death Game. Described as "over-the-top destruction" by the Toronto Star, Reeves plays a father, home alone, when two young women show up and start a game of cat and mouse. His other releases in 2015 were the documentaries Deep Web, about crime on the dark web, and Mifune: The Last Samurai, about the life of a Japanese actor (Toshiro Mifune) famous for playing samurai characters. He narrated both films.

Reeves appeared in five film releases in 2016. The first was Exposed, a crime thriller about a detective who investigates his partner's death and discovers police corruption along the way. The film received negative reviews for its confused plot, and Reeves was criticized for displaying limited facial expressions. His next release, the comedy Keanu, was better received. In it he voiced the eponymous kitten. Reeves then had a minor role in The Neon Demon, a psychological horror directed by Nicolas Winding Refn. He played Hank, a lustful motel owner who appears in Jesse's (played by Elle Fanning) nightmare. In his fourth release, he played a charismatic leader of a settlement in The Bad Batch. His final release of the year was The Whole Truth, featuring Gabriel Basso, Gugu Mbatha-Raw, Renée Zellweger, and Jim Belushi. He played Richard, a defence attorney. Noel Murray of The A.V. Club described it as "moderately clever, reasonably entertaining courtroom drama", with a skilled cast but overall a "mundane" film. Reeves also appeared in Swedish Dicks, a two-season web television series.

In 2017, Reeves agreed to reprise his role for a sequel in the John Wick franchise, John Wick: Chapter 2. The story carries on from the first film and follows John Wick as he goes on the run when a bounty is placed on him. The film was a critical and commercial success, grossing $171.5 million worldwide, more than its predecessor. Chris Hewitt of Empire magazine praised Reeves' performance, which complemented his previous action roles (Point Break and Speed). However, Justin Chang of the Los Angeles Times described the picture as "a down-and-dirty B-picture with a lustrous A-picture soul". Besides to this large-scale feature, Reeves starred in a drama, To the Bone, in which he plays a doctor helping a young woman with anorexia. It premiered at the 2017 Sundance Film Festival, followed by distribution on Netflix in July. Early reviews were positive, with praise for its non-glamorized portrayal of anorexia, although the New Statesman magazine thought it was irresponsible. That year, Reeves also made cameo appearances in the films A Happening of Monumental Proportions and SPF-18.

Reeves reunited with Winona Ryder in the 2018 comedy Destination Wedding, about wedding guests who develop a mutual affection for each other. They had worked together previously in Bram Stoker's Dracula, A Scanner Darkly and The Private Lives of Pippa Lee. Reeves also co-produced and starred in two thrillers. Siberia, in which he plays a diamond trader who travels to Siberia to search for his Russian partner, and Replicas, which tells the story of a neuroscientist who violates laws and bioethics to bring his family back to life after they die in a car crash. Siberia was critically panned; reviewers thought the plot was nonsensical and Reeves had little chemistry with co-star Ana Ularu. Replicas did not fare well with critics either; The A.V. Club praised Reeves' performance, but gave the film a grade D−, adding it is "garbage". It was also a box office failure, earning $9.3 million from a budget of $30 million.

Returning to the John Wick franchise, Reeves starred in John Wick: Chapter 3 – Parabellum (2019), the third feature in the series directed by Stahelski. The film takes place immediately after the events of John Wick: Chapter 2 and features new cast members including Halle Berry. The film was another box office hit, grossing $171 million in the United States and more than $155 million internationally. The Globe and Mails reviewer gave the film three out of four stars, praising the fight scenes, but felt there was "aesthetic overindulgence" with the cinematography. The Guardians Cath Clarke questioned Reeves' acting; she wrote that "he keeps his face statue-still [...] three movies in, franchise bloat is beginning to set in". Reeves was nominated for Favorite Male Movie Star of 2019 in the People's Choice Awards, and the film itself was nominated for Best Contemporary Film in the Art Directors Guild Awards. Reeves then voiced Duke Caboom in 2019's Toy Story 4, the fourth instalment of Pixar's Toy Story franchise. In that same year on April 27 and 28, a film festival was held in his honour, called KeanuCon, hosted in Glasgow, Scotland. Over two days, nine of his films were screened for guests.

As early as 2008, Reeves and Alex Winter had shown enthusiasm for a third Bill & Ted film, but the project went into development limbo. Finally in 2020, Bill & Ted Face the Music, the third film in the franchise was released. The critic from Salon magazine was disappointed in Reeves' performance, but praised the film for its message that "music has the power to unite the world". Leah Greenblatt of Entertainment Weekly gave the film a grade B, and complimented the onscreen chemistry between Reeves and Winter. He also appeared in The SpongeBob Movie: Sponge on the Run as a tumbleweed named Sage. Reeves appears as Johnny Silverhand in the video game Cyberpunk 2077. In December 2021, Reeves returned to the screen for the fourth film in The Matrix franchise: The Matrix Resurrections. Carrie-Anne Moss also reprised her role as Trinity. The Matrix Resurrections was a box office disappointment; one critic praised Reeves' and Moss' performances, but thought the film was "no game-changer".

Upcoming projects
In 2019, Reeves travelled to São Paulo to produce a Netflix series, Conquest. Details are being kept secret. A comic book series, BRZRKR, co-written by Reeves was published in March 2021. He is expected to star in a film adaptation of it. Reeves will also reprise the role of John Wick in two additional sequels, to be shot back-to-back. Lionsgate announced the release date of John Wick: Chapter 4 directed by Chad Stahelski. The film will premiere on March 24, 2023. Reeves will reprise his role as Johnny Silverhand in the Cyberpunk 2077 expansion, Phantom Liberty.

Personal life
In 1998, Reeves met director David Lynch's assistant Jennifer Syme at a party thrown for his band Dogstar, and they started dating. On December 24, 1999, Syme gave birth eight months into her pregnancy to the couple's child, who was stillborn. The couple broke up several weeks afterward, but later reconciled. On April 2, 2001, Syme was killed when her vehicle collided with three parked cars on Cahuenga Boulevard in Los Angeles. Syme was impaired, and also not belted in. Reeves told investigators that they were back together, and had brunch together in San Francisco the day before the accident. Reeves was a pallbearer for Syme who was buried next to their daughter. He was scheduled to film the sequels to The Matrix the following spring, but sought "peace and time", according to friend Bret Domrose of Dogstar.

Reeves has also been romantically linked to longtime friend and filmmaker Brenda Davis and he is godfather to her child, as well as model-actress China Chow. In 2009, Reeves met Alexandra Grant at a dinner party; they went on to collaborate on two books together. They went public with their relationship in November 2019.

Reeves is discreet about his spiritual beliefs, saying that it is something "personal and private". When asked if he was a spiritual person, he said that he believes "in God, faith, inner faith, the self, passion, and things", and that he is "very spiritual" and "supremely bountiful". Although he does not formally practice Buddhism, the religion has left a strong impression on him, especially after filming Little Buddha. He said, "Most of the things I've come away with from Buddhism have been human—understanding feelings, impermanence, and trying to understand other people and where they're coming from."

When asked on The Late Show with Stephen Colbert in 2019 about his views on what happens after death, Reeves replied, "I know that the ones who love us will miss us".

In 2023, the lipopeptide Keanumycin, a substance deadly to fungi, was named in honor of Reeves.

Business and philanthropy

Reeves supports several charities and causes. In response to his sister's battle with leukemia, he founded a private cancer foundation, which aids children's hospitals and provides cancer research. In June 2020, he volunteered for Camp Rainbow Gold, an Idaho children's cancer charity. Reeves has said, "Money is the last thing I think about. I could live on what I have already made for the next few centuries". It was rumoured that Reeves gave away a substantial portion, estimated to be $35–$125 million, of his earnings from The Matrix to the special effects and makeup crews. However this has been significantly embellished; Reeves negotiated a smaller deal relinquishing his contractual right to a percentage of the sequels' profits in exchange for a more extensive special effects budget.

Reeves co-founded a production company, Company Films, with friend Stephen Hamel. An avid motorcyclist, Reeves co-founded Arch Motorcycle Company, which builds and sells custom motorcycles. In 2017, Reeves, Jessica Fleischmann, and Alexandra Grant founded book publisher, X Artists' Books (also known as XAB). He has written two books: Ode to Happiness and Shadows; they are collaborations with Grant and he provided the text to her photographs and art.

Censorship
In 2022, Reeves recitation of the Beat poem "Pull My Daisy" for a virtual benefit concert for Tibet House US, a nonprofit organization affiliated with the exiled Tibetan spiritual leader, the Dalai Lama, angered Chinese nationalists. Reeves's films have been banned from streaming platforms in China such as iQiyi, Tencent Video, and Youku.

In the media

In a 2005 article for Time magazine, Lev Grossman called Reeves "Hollywood's ultimate introvert". He has been described as a workaholic, charming and "excruciatingly shy". During the production of Constantine, director Francis Lawrence commented on his personality, calling him "hardworking" and "generous". His co-star Shia LaBeouf said, "I've worked with him for a year and a couple of months, but I don't really know him that much". Erwin Stoff of 3 Arts Entertainment has been Reeves's agent and manager since he was 16, and produced many of his films. Stoff said that Reeves "is a really private person" and keeps his distance from other people.

In 2010, an image of Reeves became an internet meme after photographs of him were published, sitting on a park bench with a sad facial expression. The images were posted on the 4chan discussion board and were soon distributed via several blogs and media outlets, leading to the "Sad Keanu" meme being spread on the internet. An unofficial holiday was created when a Facebook fan page declared June 15 as "Cheer-up Keanu Day". He would later downplay the photo, saying, "Man, I was eating a sandwich. I was thinking—I had some stuff going on. I was hungry."

Reeves's casual persona and ability to establish rapport have been observed by the public, leading him to be dubbed the "Internet's boyfriend". In 2019, Vox cited Reeves's unorthodox filmography and ability to appeal to nerd culture as the primary reasons for his internet popularity. While filming Bill & Ted Face the Music in July 2019, Reeves and other cast members came across a house with a banner reading "You're Breathtaking" and "Mini Keanu", two memes that had come out of Reeves's appearance at the Electronic Entertainment Expo 2019 for the game Cyberpunk 2077. Reeves took time to sign the banner, and talk to the family.

Reeves appeared on Forbes annual Celebrity 100 list in 2001 and 2002, at number 36 and 49, respectively. In 2005, Reeves received a star on the Hollywood Walk of Fame for his contributions to the motion picture industry. In 2016, The Hollywood Reporter calculated that Reeves had earned $250 million for The Matrix franchise, making him one of the highest-paid actors. In 2020, The New York Times ranked him at number four on its list of the 25 Greatest Actors of the 21st Century.

Filmography and awards

Prolific in film since 1985, Reeves's most acclaimed and highest-grossing films, according to the review aggregate site Rotten Tomatoes, include: River's Edge (1987), Bill and Ted's Excellent Adventure (1989), My Own Private Idaho (1991), Much Ado About Nothing (1993), Speed (1994), The Matrix (1999), John Wick (2014), John Wick: Chapter2 (2017), John Wick: Chapter 3Parabellum (2019), and Toy Story 4 (2019). Reeves has won four MTV Movie Awards, and received two Best Actor nominations at the Saturn Awards. He was nominated twice for a People's Choice Award: Favorite Male Movie Star and Favorite Action Movie Star, for his performance in John Wick: Chapter 3Parabellum (2019).

In September 2021, Tae Kwon Do Life Magazine deemed Reeves the "#1 Martial Arts movie star in the world" based upon his multiple films in the genre, their popularity, and sheer box office gross.

Bibliography
 
 
BRZRKR (with Matt Kindt and Ron Garney, 12-issue mini-series, Boom! Studios, 2021)

Notes

References

Further reading

External links

 
 
 
 
 
 Keanu Reeves performs "Pull My Daisy" on the 35th Annual Tibet House Benefit Concert March 3, 2022

1964 births
Living people
20th-century Canadian bass guitarists
20th-century Canadian guitarists
20th-century Canadian male actors
20th-century Canadian male musicians
21st-century Canadian bass guitarists
21st-century Canadian guitarists
21st-century Canadian male actors
21st-century Canadian male musicians
Alternative rock bass guitarists
Alternative rock guitarists
Canadian alternative rock musicians
Canadian documentary film producers
Canadian expatriate male actors in the United States
Film producers from Ontario
Canadian male film actors
Canadian male guitarists
Canadian male television actors
Canadian male voice actors
Canadian people of American descent
Canadian people of Chinese descent
Canadian people of English descent
Canadian people of Portuguese descent
Canadian philanthropists
Canadian practitioners of Brazilian jiu-jitsu
Canadian rock bass guitarists
Canadian rock guitarists
Canadian spiritualists
Dogstar (band) members
Grunge musicians
Internet memes
Male actors from Beirut
Male actors from Ontario
Male actors from Toronto
Male bass guitarists
Musicians from Beirut
Musicians from Toronto
Naturalized citizens of Canada
People of Native Hawaiian descent
Actors with dyslexia